Ayumi Hamasaki Countdown Live 2012–2013 A: Wake Up is Japanese pop singer Ayumi Hamasaki's 12th Countdown concert DVD. It was released on April 08, 2013. Hamasaki performed three dates at the Yoyogi National Gymnasium for this countdown, on December 29, 30 and 31, 2012.

The DVD/Blu-ray includes the first ever live performances of songs such as Wake Me Up, Snowy Kiss and Missing. All three songs were included one month later on Hamasaki's 14th studio album Love Again (2013).

Track list
Track list taken from Avex.

 Wake Me Up
 Rule
 Disco-munication
 Beautiful Fighters
 Fly High
 Snowy Kiss
 Missing
 Together When...
 Everywhere Nowhere
 You & Me
 Song 4 u   
 Who...
 Humming7/4
 Evolution ～ Surreal
 Until That Day...
Encore
 Trauma
 Audience 
 Boys & Girls
 My All

Sales

DVD: 18,888

Blu-ray: 5,911

References

 http://avex.jp/ayu/index.php

Ayumi Hamasaki video albums
Live video albums
Albums recorded at the Yoyogi National Gymnasium